Xırmandalı (also, Charmandaly, Kharmandali, Kharmandaly, and Khyrmandaly) is a village and the most populous municipality, except for the capital Biləsuvar, in the Bilasuvar Rayon of Azerbaijan.  It has a population of 7,824.

References 

Populated places in Bilasuvar District